Conservative Judaism was a peer-reviewed scholarly journal published by the Rabbinical Assembly and the Jewish Theological Seminary of America from 1945 until 2014.

History 
The journal was founded in 1945 under the editorship of Rabbi Leon S. Lang as a publication of the Rabbinical Assembly (RA). In 1968, the journal became a joint project of the RA and the Jewish Theological Seminary. According to Pamela Nadell, "the quarterly was designed for the elite--Conservative leaders and readers learned in Judaica," and it "remained influential chiefly among the leadership of the Conservative movement."

Leadership

Editors 
Its editors were:
Leon S. Lang, 1945–1952
Samuel Dresner, 1955–1964
Jack Riemer, 1964–1965
S. Gershon Levi, 1965–1969
Mordecai Waxman, 1969–1974
Stephen C. Lerner, 1974–1977
Myron Fenster, 1977–1979
Arthur A. Chiel, 1979–1980
Harold S. Kushner, 1980–1984
David Wolf Silverman, 1984–1989
Shamai Kanter, 1989–1993
Benjamin Edidin Scolnic, 1993–2000
Martin Samuel Cohen, 2000-2014
Benjamin Kramer, 2014

Editorial board members 

Jerome Abrams (1967)
Jacob Agus (1951-1952)
David Aronson (1960)
J. Leonard Azneer (1951)
Ephraim Bennett (1951-1952)
Sidney Bogner (1951)
Eli A. Bohnen (1967)
Ben Zion Bokser (1948, 1951, 1960)
Alexander Burnstein (1945-1951)
Gershon Chertoff (1951-1952)
Seymour J. Cohen (1951)
Alan Cooper
David G. Dalin (historian)
Samuel Dresner (1967)
Jessica Feingold (1967)
Myron Fenster (1967)
Theodore Friedman (1948)
Neil Gillman (theologian)
Judah Goldin (1951)
Robert Gordis (biblical scholar) (1948)
Philip Graubart (1951)
Simon Greenberg (former vice-chancellor of the Jewish Theological Seminary of America) (1948)
Judith Hauptman (Talmudist)
Arthur Hertzberg (1948-1951)
Max Kadushin (scholar of rabbinics) (1948)
Abraham Karp (1960)
Wolfe Kelman (1967)
Leon Liebreich (1951)
Philip Kieval (1951)
Alfred Kolatch (1951)
Myer S. Kripke (1948)
Morris B. Margolies (1951)
A. Elihu Michelson (1952)
Herbert Parzen (1951-1952)
Jack Riemer (1967)
Henry Moses Rosenthal (1948)
Jack Wertheimer (historian)
Edward T. Sandrow (1948)
Joseph Sarachek (1951)
Howard Singer (1951)
Ira F. Stone (Musar scholar)
Seymour Siegel (1967)
Ralph Simon (1951)
David Silverman (1967)
Max Weine (1951-1952)
Joseph Wise (1951)

Editorial Council 
Max Arzt (1945-1948)
Herman Abramowitz (1945)
Mortimer J. Cohen (1945-1948)
Solomon Goldman (1945-1948)
Israel Goldstein (1945-1948)
Solomon Grayzel (1945-1948)
Israel H. Levinthal (1945-1948)
Louis M. Levitsky (1945-1948)

External links
 Archive of Articles from Conservative Judaism, 1945-2014

References

Judaic studies journals
Publications established in 1945
Publications disestablished in 2014